Rachel McCann  (born 29 April 1993) is a New Zealand field hockey midfielder and part of the New Zealand women's national field hockey team. 

With the national youth team she won the bronze medal at the 2010 Summer Youth Olympics. On club level she plays for Canterbury in the New Zealand National Hockey League.

References

External links

1993 births
Living people
New Zealand female field hockey players
Place of birth missing (living people)
Field hockey players at the 2010 Summer Youth Olympics
Female field hockey midfielders
20th-century New Zealand women
21st-century New Zealand women